David Hunt (October 22, 1779 – May 18, 1861) was an American planter based in the Natchez District of Mississippi who controlled 25 plantations, thousands of acres, and more than 1,000 slaves in the antebellum era. From New Jersey, he joined his uncle in Mississippi business. He became a major philanthropist in the South, contributing to educational institutions in Mississippi, as well as the American Colonization Society and Mississippi Colonization Society, the latter of which he was a founding member.

Known as "King David," Hunt made a fortune in cotton production and sales. He was one of twelve millionaires residing near Natchez, Mississippi, at a time when there only were 35 millionaires in the entire United States.

Biography

Early life
David Hunt was born on October 22, 1779 on a farm near Ringoes, New Jersey. It was west and in the country compared to the capital of Trenton, New Jersey. He had a brother, Andrew Hunt, and several half siblings from his father Jonathan's second marriage. They were descendants of Ralph Hunt the line being Ralph, Edward, Jonathan, Jonathan, Jonathan.

Hunt moved as a young man to the Natchez District in approximately 1800.

Career
Hunt inherited Woodlawn Plantation near Rodney, Mississippi from his uncle, Abijah Hunt (1762-1811), who had become wealthy as a merchant to the Army and later in cotton. He ended up owning twenty-five plantations in the Natchez District. In addition to the twenty-one plantations listed below, Hunt also owned the following four plantations: Fatherland, Fairview, Oak Burn and Givin Place.

 His Jefferson County plantations were: Calviton, Woodlawn, Huntley, Waverly, Fatlands, Southside, Brick Quarters, Ashland, Black Creek, Oakwood, Buena Vista, and Servis Island. Zachary Taylor bought the approximately 2,000-acre Buena Vista Plantation (also known as Cypress Grove Plantation), which bordered Ashland Plantation and was formed on the land of David Hunt and others. It was located about ten miles south of Rodney along the Mississippi River. President Taylor and his son Richard "Dick" Taylor - later a Confederate General - visited Hunt's residence on Woodlawn Plantation.
 His Adams County plantations were: Lansdowne, located three miles north of Natchez (on what is now highway 555); Homewood, which adjoined Lansdowne; and Oakley Grove, located nine miles northeast of Natchez.
 His Issaquena County plantations were: Wilderness Plantation, located on the Mississippi River near Mayerville; and Georgiana Plantation, located on Deer Creek south of Rolling Fork. David's son George Hunt owned 400 acres on the Mississippi River in Issaquena County close to Tallulah.

 His Louisiana plantations were: Arcola, located just south of the town of Waterproof, Louisiana in Tensas Parish; the adjoining plantations of Argyle and Belle Ella, located to the west of Waterproof, also in Tensas Parish; and Hole in the Wall, located on the Mississippi River on Maxwell Road in northern Concordia Parish, Louisiana

Shortly before the American Civil War, Hunt and his adult children owned a total of some 1,700 slaves and controlled tens of thousands of acres of land. Cyrus Bellus and Peter Brown were two of David Hunt's slaves whose interviews are included in the WPA Slave Narrative Collection for the state of Arkansas. Peter Brown told of a time when he was a slave on David Hunt's Woodlawn Plantation and Dr. Coleman of Wyolah Plantation came to care for his parents, who had contracted cholera.

As a result of his extensive holdings and cotton production, Hunt became one of the wealthiest cotton planters in the Antebellum South. Additionally, he owned business concerns in Cincinnati, Ohio and Lexington, Kentucky. At his financial peak in about 1850, Hunt was worth about $2,000,000.

Philanthropy
Hunt was among the largest financial supporters of Oakland College, near Rodney, Mississippi, which was founded in affiliation with the Presbyterian Church. Over the years he gave a total of about $175,000 to the college.  He was a trustee of the College for years. His sons, Abijah, George, Andrew and Dunbar, all graduated from Oakland College. Oakland had to close during the war, as its students went off to war. Some of the facility was damaged during the war, and it never successfully resumed operations after the war.

In 1870 the college was sold to the state of Mississippi. The state legislature used this facility to establish the first land grant institution for African Americans in American history, named Alcorn A&M College and now called Alcorn University, a historically black college.

The Presbyterian Church used the money from the sale to found Chamberlain-Hunt Academy in nearby Port Gibson in 1879.  C.H.A. transitioned to the military routine in 1915 and was a military college preparatory school until 1971, when girls were admitted and the military discipline was greatly relaxed.  Many of David Hunt's descendants or relatives attended Chamberlain-Hunt over the years and until quite recently.  The old school did not open in August 2014 and the future is uncertain. The legacy of Oakland College was named to honor Presbyterian minister Reverend Jeremiah Chamberlain (1794-1851), the founding president of Oakland College, and David Hunt, who had been Oakland's most generous benefactor.

Hunt also was a major supporter of the Rodney Presbyterian Church. He donated the land upon which the church was built and contributed to the building of the church as well. All of his children were baptized there. When the church decided to rent the pews to the church members to raise money, Hunt paid to rent them all to ensure that the poor could attend. He paid a large portion of the pastor's salary, gave the pastor the use of one of his slaves, and often gave the pastor beef and mutton from his plantations. Hunt also gave beef to the poor families of Rodney each Christmas.

As a member of the Mississippi Colonization Society and its parent organization the American Colonization Society, he donated to establish a colony for free African Americans in Liberia. Hunt once donated $49,999.99 to this cause. One of Hunt's eccentricities was to write checks for one penny less than an even dollar amount. He also gave a small amount to the Fayette Female Academy in Fayette, Mississippi.

Personal life
Hunt resided on Woodlawn Plantation in Jefferson County, Mississippi, which was seven miles south of Rodney, Mississippi and approximately 25 miles northeast of Natchez. He was one of the twelve millionaires living near Natchez in the antebellum era, when there were only thirty-five millionaires living in the entire United States. He was nicknamed "King David."

Hunt spent many summers in and around Lexington, Kentucky. He travelled by carriage along with a baggage wagon and saddle horses. The trip from Mississippi took one month. He was related to John Wesley Hunt, who lived in the Hunt-Morgan House in Lexington.

Hunt married three times
 His first wife was Margaret (Stampley) Hunt.
 His second wife was Mary (Calvit) Hunt.
 His third wife was Ann (Ferguson) Hunt.  Ann's father David Ferguson grew up on his parents' Mount Locust Inn and Plantation; and her sister Charlotte, who was married to William Aylette Buckner, lived at Airlie. Ann and her husband David Hunt had 14 children, but only seven lived past the age of 21. Five of these adult children married before the Civil War. Hunt gave each at least one plantation and 100 slaves as a dowry. These gifts reduced Hunt's net worth, which was listed in the 1860 U.S. Census as $1,086,825.

 His daughter Mary Ann married James Archer and received Oakwood Plantation.
 His son Abijah married Mary Agnes Walton and was given Calviton Plantation.
 His son George Ferguson Hunt married Anna Watson and received Huntley Plantation.
 His daughter Catherine married William S. Balfour and received Homewood.
 His daughter Charlotte married George Marshall and received Lansdowne Plantation.

Two of David's seven adult children (Dunbar and Elizabeth) married after the American Civil War and David's death. They each got at least one plantation, but the slaves had been emancipated. 
 His son Dunbar married Leila Lawrence Brent and received Wilderness Plantation. and Southside Plantation 
 His daughter Elizabeth married William F. Ogden and received Hole in the Wall Plantation and Black Creek Plantation.

Death
Hunt died on May 18, 1861 on Woodlawn Plantation at the age of 81. He was buried in the Calviton Plantation cemetery. Calviton Plantation adjoined Woodlawn Plantation where David had his main residence.

Legacy
The Chamberlain-Hunt Academy, a Presbyterian military private academy in Port Gibson, Mississippi, was named in his honor.
The David Hunt Award is made annually at Alcorn State University in Lorman, Mississippi.

References

External links
 This link has information about the Hunt's Georgiana Plantation in Issaquena County, Mississippi
 The map at the library of congress website shows David Hunt's Issaquena County, Mississippi Plantations. Wilderness Plantation is shown on the Mississippi River just above Mayerville. Where the name "David Hunt" is written along "Little or Lower Deer Creek" at the center of the map is Georgiana Plantation.
 The map at the library of congress website shows David Hunt's Issaquena County, Mississippi Plantations. Wilderness Plantation is shown on the Mississippi River with David Hunt's son Dunbar as the owner. David Hunt's son George F. Hunt is shown owning 400 acres on the Mississippi River adjacent to his brother in law, William Balfour's Fairland Plantation.
 The map at the library of congress website shows David Hunt's Tensas Parish, Louisiana Plantations. Arcola, Argyle and Belle Ella Plantations are in the area to the left of the Mississippi River town of Waterproof (near the bottom left of the map).  The G.M. Marshall written by Arcola was one of David Hunt's sons-in-law. The names Misses Hunt and T.W. Hunt written by the other two plantations were descendants of David Hunt. Hole-in-the-Wall Plantation (not marked on the map) was below Arcola at the bottom of the map between Lake St. John and the Mississippi River in Concordia Parish.
 The map at the library of congress website shows some of David Hunt's Jefferson County, Mississippi plantations. Ashland, Buena Vista, Fatland, Brick Quarter and Woodlawn Plantations are shown near the bottom of the map below the town of Rodney. Woodlawn is mistakenly labeled as Woodland on the map. This map also shows two of David Hunt's Louisiana plantations. Hole-in-the-Wall and Arcola Plantations are shown at the bottom of the map.

1779 births
1861 deaths
People from Trenton, New Jersey
People from Natchez, Mississippi
People from Jefferson County, Mississippi
American planters
Philanthropists from Mississippi
American Presbyterians
American slave owners